Protektor may refer to:

 Protector (2009 film), a 2009 Czech film
 MV Protektor, a bulk cargo ship which sank in the North Atlantic Ocean in January 1991

See also 
 Protector (disambiguation)